Albert Gustave Bedane (1893–1980) lived in Jersey during the German occupation during World War II, and provided shelter to a Jewish woman and others, preventing their capture by the Nazis.

He was born in Angers in France in 1893 and lived in Jersey from 1894. He served in the British Army 1917-1920 and was naturalised as a British subject by the Royal Court of Jersey in 1921. By profession he was a masseur/physiotherapist.

In 1966 the Soviet government presented Albert Bedane (along with other Jersey resistance activists who had helped and sheltered escaped Soviet slave-workers) with a gold watch. On 4 January 2000, Albert Bedane was recognised as Righteous Among the Nations.

A plaque erected by the Vingtaine de la Ville marks the site of his home in Roseville Street, Saint Helier, where he sheltered escapees.

In 2004 BBC South West launched an audience vote for South West Heroes. The four nominations from Jersey, which falls within the BBC's South West broadcasting region, were Gerald Durrell, Sir Walter Ralegh, Sir Billy Butlin and Albert Bedane.

In 2010, Bedane was posthumously named a British Hero of the Holocaust by the British Government.

Notes

External links
BBC article
RESCUERS profile
Occupation Memorial
Vingtaine plaque to Albert Bedane
Albert Bedane – his activity to save Jews' lives during the Holocaust, at Yad Vashem website

1893 births
1980 deaths
People from Saint Helier
French Righteous Among the Nations
British Righteous Among the Nations
Honours recipients from Jersey
People from Angers
British physiotherapists
British Army personnel of World War I